Byron Foss (born October 6, 1979, Monarch Beach, California) is an American soccer player who spent the 2004 season playing goalkeeper for the A-League's Syracuse Salty Dogs on loan from the Colorado Rapids of Major League Soccer. He played 21 games.  In 2005, Foss started five games at keeper for the Rapids, notching three wins and two draws. His last game was played on Oct 8, 2005.

Foss was undrafted after graduating from Southern Methodist University in 2003, but was signed to the Rapids' developmental roster on March 18, 2003.

Byron Foss joined Grubb & Ellis Commercial Real Estate in 2006. In April 2012, BGC Partners &  bought commercial real estate firm, Grubb & Ellis, to form Newmark Grubb Knight Frank Byron is currently Managing Director at Newmark Grubb Knight Frank in Newport Beach, California.

Awards
2001 NCAA Division I All American First Team
2001 NCAA Division I MVC Defensive Player of the Year

References

External links 
 
 
 Newmark Grubb Knight Frank Profile
 Linkedin Profile
 Sports Illustrated Profile

1979 births
Living people
American soccer players
Colorado Rapids players
Syracuse Salty Dogs players
SMU Mustangs men's soccer players
USL First Division players
Major League Soccer players
Association football goalkeepers
All-American men's college soccer players